Fleetwood Walker could refer to:
 Bernard Fleetwood-Walker, English artist
 Moses Fleetwood Walker, African-American baseball player

See also
 Fleetwood (disambiguation)
 Walker (disambiguation)